The 2001 SEC Championship Game was won by the LSU Tigers 31–20 over the Tennessee Volunteers. The game was played in the Georgia Dome in Atlanta, Georgia on December 8, 2001 and was televised to a national audience on CBS.  The loss kept Tennessee from a second appearance in the BCS National Championship Game.

References

External links
Recap of the game from SECsports.com
Box score and statistics from LSUsports.net
Box score and statistics from UTsports.com

SEC Championship Game
SEC Championship Game
LSU Tigers football games
Tennessee Volunteers football games
December 2001 sports events in the United States
2001 in sports in Georgia (U.S. state)
2001 in Atlanta